Jeonju National Museum is a national museum located in Jeonju, Jeollabuk-do, South Korea. It opened on October 26, 1990, as the ninth South Korean national museum.

The Main Building comprises three permanent exhibits, an Archeology room, a Fine Art room, a Folklore room, and one special exhibit room.

See also
List of museums in South Korea

References

External links
 Jeonju National Museum Official site

National museums of South Korea
Buildings and structures in Jeonju
Museums in North Jeolla Province
Museums established in 1990